Jason John Litzau (born June 29, 1983) is an American former professional boxer who competed between 2002 and 2016. He challenged once for the IBF featherweight title in 2008.

Early life
In his youth Litzau played Little League Baseball, as a pitcher where he won a little league title by pitching a shutout. He attended Harding Senior High School in St. Paul, Minnesota. Litzau's brother Allen Litzau is also a professional boxer.

Amateur career
Known as "The American Boy", Litzau began boxing at 11 years old and reportedly compiled an amateur record of 125-10 Litzau is a former Silver Gloves national champion, having finished second at the 2001 U.S. Championships and earning a spot on the 2001 U.S. National team.

Litzau turned pro in 2002.

Professional career
Litzau turned pro on November 16, 2002 and as of September 2013 had a record of 29-3 with 22 knockouts.  He has garnered considerable fanfare due to his appearances on ESPN's fight cards. His first loss was against Jose Hernandez on December 16, 2006, on HBO.  He lost to IBF World Featherweight Champ Robert Guerrero in a title match on Leap Day, February 29, 2008.

The Hernandez Incident
Litzau was upset in his first spotlight appearance on HBO's Boxing After Dark in a fight against Jose Hernandez.  The fight was intended to showcase Litzau's considerable talent and box office draw.  Litzau was ahead on points (68-64 on all three cards) when Hernandez scored an eighth-round knockout over Litzau with a clubbing right hand to the head.  Litzau had been dropped by a right hand in round one, but appeared well in control of the bout until getting knocked out in round 8.

IBF Featherweight Championship
Litzau lost via 8th-round TKO to Robert Guerrero in his first shot at the title, on February 29, 2008.

NABF Lightweight Championship
On August 15, 2009, as an undercard to Roy Jones Jr. vs. Jeff Lacy, Litzau fought Verquan Kimbrough for the vacant NABF Lightweight title. Litzau won by RTD at the end of Round 3. Litzau moved up two weight classes for the fight.

NABF Super Featherweight Championship
On November 4, 2009 Litzau headlined an ESPN2 Friday Night Fights program against 15-4 Johnnie Edwards with the NABF Super Featherweight title in play. Litzau won the fight by unanimous decision, winning a second NABF title.

Litzau defended his title against Rocky Juarez on April 3, 2010, winning by technical decision when the fight was halted in the seventh round due to a bad cut on Litzau's cheek which referee Jay Nady ruled was caused by an accidental head butt.

On the undercard of Juan Manuel Marquez vs. Michael Katsidis, Liztau beat former WBA and IBF champion, Panama's Celestino Caballero.

Professional record

|- style="margin:0.5em auto; font-size:95%;"
|align="center" colspan=8|29 Wins (21 knockouts), 3 Losses, 0 Draw
|- style="margin:0.5em auto; font-size:95%;"
|align=center style="border-style: none none solid solid; background: #e3e3e3"|Res.
|align=center style="border-style: none none solid solid; background: #e3e3e3"|Record
|align=center style="border-style: none none solid solid; background: #e3e3e3"|Opponent
|align=center style="border-style: none none solid solid; background: #e3e3e3"|Type
|align=center style="border-style: none none solid solid; background: #e3e3e3"|Rd., Time
|align=center style="border-style: none none solid solid; background: #e3e3e3"|Date
|align=center style="border-style: none none solid solid; background: #e3e3e3"|Venue and Location
|align=center style="border-style: none none solid solid; background: #e3e3e3"|Notes
|-align=center
|Win || 29-3-0 ||align=left| Ira Terry
||| 1  || 2012-06-16 || align=left| 
|align=left|
|-align=center
|Loss || 28-3-0 ||align=left| Adrien Broner
||| 1  || 2011-06-18|| align=left| 
|align=left|
|-align=center
|Win || 28-2-0 || align=left|Celestino Caballero
|SD  || 10  || 2010-11-27 ||align=left|MGM Grand, Las Vegas, Nevada, U.S.
|align=left|
|-align=center
|Win || 27-2-0 || align=left|Rocky Juarez
|TD || 7 (3:00) || 2010-04-03 ||align=left|Mandalay Bay, Las Vegas, Nevada, U.S.
|align=left|
|-align=center
|Win || 26-2-0 || align=left|Johnnie Edwards
|UD || 10 (10) || 2009-11-04 ||align=left|Corrosion Hangar, Camp Lejuene, North Carolina, U.S.
|align=left|
|-align=center
|Win || 25-2-0 || align=left|Verquan Kimbrough
|RTD || 3 (3:00) || 2009-08-15 ||align=left|Coast Coliseum, Biloxi, Mississippi, U.S.
|align=left|
|-align=center
|Win || 24-2-0 || align=left|Phillip Payne
|TKO || 5 (0:52) || 2009-04-18 ||align=left|Target Center, Minneapolis, Minnesota, U.S.
|align=left|
|-align=center
|Loss || 23-2-0 || align=left|Robert Guerrero
|KO || 8 (2:25) || 2008-02-29 ||align=left|Tachi Palace Hotel & Casino, Lemoore, California, U.S.
|align=left|
|-align=center
|Win || 23-1-0 || align=left|Edel Ruiz
|UD || 10  || 2007-11-23 ||align=left|Staples Center, Los Angeles, California, U.S.
|align=left|
|-align=center
|Win || 22-1-0 || align=left|Emmanuel Lucero
|TKO || 2 (2:48) || 2007-08-17 ||align=left|Harrah's Rincon Casino, Valley Center, California, U.S.
|align=left|
|-align=center
|Win || 21-1-0 || align=left|Aldo Valtierra
|UD || 10  || 2007-04-25 ||align=left|Roy Wilkins Auditorium, Saint Paul, Minnesota, U.S.
|align=left|
|-align=center
|Loss || 20-1-0 || align=left|José Hernández
|KO || 8 (2:52) || 2006-12-16 ||align=left|Miccosukee Indian Gaming Resort, Miami, Florida, U.S.
|align=left|
|-align=center
|Win || 20-0-0 || align=left| Sammy Ventura
|TKO || 2  || 2006-10-20 ||align=left|Cicero Stadium, Cicero, Illinois, U.S.
|align=left|
|-align=center
|Win || 19-0-0 || align=left| Nicky Bentz
|KO || 1 (10),  || 2006-07-14 ||align=left|Harrah's Rincon Casino & Resort, Valley Center, California, U.S.
|align=left|
|-align=center
|Win || 18-0-0 || align=left| Debendra Thapa
|KO || 2 (10),  || 2006-05-11 ||align=left|Schuetzen Park, North Bergen, New Jersey, U.S.
|align=left|
|-align=center

See also
Notable boxing families
List of NABF champions

References

External links
 
Main Events Bio

1983 births
Living people
Lightweight boxers
Featherweight boxers
Boxers from Saint Paul, Minnesota
American male boxers